Parliamentary elections were held in Syria on 1 and 2 August 1977. The result was a victory for the Arab Socialist Ba'ath Party, which won 125 of the 195 seats.

Results

References

Syria
1977 in Syria
Parliamentary elections in Syria
August 1977 events in Asia
Election and referendum articles with incomplete results